"Lovely Money" is a single by English rock band the Damned, released on 18 June 1982.

Their first release with new label Bronze, it showcased the band's willingness to experiment, being a seemingly lightweight slice of pop thanks to a disco-style electronic drumbeat, which contrasted with a voiceover provided by former Bonzo Dog Doo-Dah Band frontman Vivian Stanshall that criticised the nationalism that had arisen following the Falklands War in 1982. The "Disco Mix" was essentially the same track, with the backing sped up by the mischievous band.

Bronze attempted to boost sales by issuing a picture disc version of the single as well, and also issued the single in France, Germany, the Netherlands, Italy, Australia and New Zealand.

Track listing
All songs by Scabies, Sensible, Vanian, Gray.
 "Lovely Money" - 5:21
 "I Think I'm Wonderful" - 3:06
 "Lovely Money (Disco Mix)"

Production credits
Producers
 Tony Mansfield
 The Damned

Musicians
 Dave Vanian − vocals
 Captain Sensible − guitar, keyboards
 Rat Scabies − drums
 Paul Gray − bass
 Viv Stanshall − spoken word on "Lovely Money"

External links

1982 singles
The Damned (band) songs
Song recordings produced by Tony Mansfield
Songs written by Rat Scabies
Songs written by Captain Sensible
Songs written by David Vanian
Songs written by Paul Gray (English musician)
British rock songs
1982 songs
Bronze Records singles